This is a list of Statutory rules made in the Northern Ireland in the year 2021.

1-100

101-200

201-348

See also

List of Acts of the Northern Ireland Assembly from 2021
List of Acts of the Parliament of the United Kingdom from 2021

References

Law of Northern Ireland
Law of the United Kingdom
2021
2021 in British politics
Northern Ireland
Northern Ireland law-related lists